Ophthalmitis rufilauta is a moth in the family Geometridae first described by Louis Beethoven Prout in 1925. It is found in Borneo in lowland and lower montane rainforests. The species is distinguished by the brown shading between the hindwing antemedial line and the discal mark.

References

Boarmiini
Moths of Borneo
Moths described in 1925